Maria Strong may refer to:
 Maria Strong (athlete), Australian shot put Paralympian
 Maria Strong (attorney), American attorney and Associate Register of Copyrights